Neuvireuil is a commune in the Pas-de-Calais department in the Hauts-de-France region of France.

Geography

Population

Places of interest
 The seventeenth century church of St. Amé, rebuilt after World War I.

See also
Communes of the Pas-de-Calais department

References

External links

 Official website of Neuvireuil

Communes of Pas-de-Calais